Carlo Montagnese (born July 29, 1987), known professionally as Illangelo, is a Canadian record producer, songwriter, musician and mixing engineer from Calgary, Alberta, who came to attention as long-time collaborator of the Weeknd. A Grammy Award winner, his work includes Post Malone's "I Fall Apart", Fall Out Boy "The Last of the Real Ones", Lykke Li, M.I.A., MØ, executive production of the Weeknd's 2011 mixtapes, the 2012 compilation album from the Weeknd titled Trilogy along with singles from rappers Wiz Khalifa's "Remember You", Drake's "Crew Love", Ricky Hil's "Nomads", (all featuring the Weeknd), and remixes such as Lady Gaga's "Marry the Night (The Weeknd and Illangelo remix)" and Florence and the Machine's "Shake It Out (The Weeknd remix)". He was one half of the duo Somewhere Else with collaborator Billy Walsh, and he released his debut concept album History of Man on August 20, 2013 under his label Hear the Art Inc., Skrillex's OWSLA label and Brodinski's Bromance Records imprint.

Early life
Illangelo grew up in Calgary, Alberta. After doing music there for 8 years, he says, "It came to a point where I realized I was not going to reach my goal of what I wanted to do with my life. I realized I ha[d] to go to Toronto." He moved to Toronto in 2010, saved up some money, and gave himself "one year to make [it] happen."

Music career
In December 2010, Illangelo and the Weeknd connected in Toronto and did "Crew Love", making it the first time he got to work with an artist that he genuinely loved and admired. Illangelo thought he would have to move back to Calgary as his money ran out, but then began to work on House of Balloons with producer Doc McKinney and the Weeknd. In January 2011, Drake decided to take "Crew Love" for his upcoming album. 2012 was spent working mainly on the Weeknd's Trilogy.

On August 20, 2013, Illangelo released his debut concept album titled History of Man, which he describes as "a literary, visual and audio narrative inspired by the epic poem Paradise Lost by 17th-century English poet John Milton".

Illangelo released a single titled "What The Fuss" on February 18, 2014, which features up and coming Toronto native Rochelle Jordan. Earlier that month, he released a series of demos from the pre-House of Balloons era (circa 2010) on his Bandcamp page.

On May 2, 2014, Illangelo collaborated with the Sydney trio Movement on their self titled debut EP. Their self-described style of minimal soul in combination with Illangelo's futuristic sound created a unique texture that has since been gaining much momentum selling out their Australian tour and several dates across the USA and Europe. Additionally "Like Lust" and "Ivory" went on receive back to back Best New Track on Pitchfork.

Illangelo released his single "Clockwork", featuring vocalist Phlo Finister, on May 12, 2014. Shortly after he released a video with Los Angeles filmmaker Lance Drake. It has since gotten Staff Picked on Vimeo.

In an interview with Earmilk on July 1, 2014, Illangelo announced that he and Phlo Finister had created a band together called Youthquaker. The group's first release "Projections", containing 3 songs, was released via a BitTorrent Bundle. The songs were downloaded over 900,000 times in the first week of release.

Discography

Singles produced

Full discography

Awards and nominations

References

External links
 



1987 births
Canadian people of Italian descent
Canadian record producers
Grammy Award winners
Living people
Musicians from Calgary